Thomas Joseph Whelan (January 3, 1894 – June 26, 1957) was a professional football player who spent three years in the American Professional Football Association, the forerunner to the National Football League, with the Canton Bulldogs in 1919 and 1920, winning the national championship alongside Jim Thorpe.  He then played with the Cleveland Tigers in 1921. He was also a professional baseball player in the National League for the Boston Braves, at first base in 1920.

Whelan managed to attend the colleges of Dartmouth College, Georgetown University, Boston College, Notre Dame from  1913 until 1920.

He went on to become a coach, athletic director and principal of Lynn English High School, where the academic wing built in the 1990s was named after him.  He was married to Mildred, and had five children – Thomas, Mary Jane, Mildred, Robert and William.

In the late 1930s, he umpired for several summers in the Cape Cod Baseball League, and served as umpire-in-chief in 1937 and 1938.

Known for his encouraging and positive outlook, he assisted many Lynn English athletes attend college.  In this spirit, his many grandchildren maintain an annual scholarship in honor of their grandfather/grandmother, and their parents who all attended Lynn English High School.

References

External links

Tom Whelan biography from Society for American Baseball Research (SABR)

1894 births
1957 deaths
Boston Braves players
Boston College Eagles football players
Canton Bulldogs players
Cape Cod Baseball League
Cleveland Tigers (NFL) players
Dartmouth Big Green football players
Georgetown Hoyas football players
Notre Dame Fighting Irish baseball players
Notre Dame Fighting Irish football players
Players of American football from Massachusetts